Koontz may refer to:
Koontz (surname)
Koontz Lake, Indiana, a census-designated place in the U.S.
Koontz House (disambiguation) – multiple buildings
Koontz v. St. Johns River Water Management District, a 2013 United States Supreme Court case

See also

Koons